Dimitrios Meliopoulos (born 22 March 2000) is a Greek former professional footballer who played as a defensive midfielder.

Career

Xanthi
On 4 November 2017, Meliopoulos made his debut in Super League at the age of 17, as a substitute in a 3–1 away win against Panetolikos.

PAOK
According to rumours, PAOK will be turning their attention to signing youngsters that have the potential for a bright future at the club. PAOK’s first transfer target in January 2019 will be securing 18-year-old Xanthi midfielder Dimitris Meliopoulos. With both clubs still negotiating the deal at this point in time, it is unclear whether Meliopoulos will join the club next month in the January transfer period or at the end of the 2018–19 Super League campaign in June. He did sign for the Thessaloniki club in May 2019, but after not featuring in the new head coach's plans and being told he would be sent on loan, he shockingly announced his retirement from the sport two months later, at the age of just 19. Meliopoulos has been a regular for the Greece U19s national team as a defensive midfielder.

References

2000 births
Living people
Greek footballers
Xanthi F.C. players
Greece youth international footballers
Super League Greece players
PAOK FC players
Association football midfielders
People from Imathia
Footballers from Central Macedonia